The 2013 World Junior Wrestling Championships were the 37th edition of the World Junior Wrestling Championships and were held in Sofia, Croatia between August 12 - 18, 2013.

Medal table

Medal summary

Men's freestyle

Greco-Roman

Women's freestyle

References

World Junior Championships
Wrestling Championships
International wrestling competitions hosted by Bulgaria
World Junior Wrestling Championships